The Pacific 8 Intercollegiate Hockey Conference (PAC-8) is a collegiate men's ice hockey conference that competes in Division 2 of the American Collegiate Hockey Association. 

The PAC-8 was originally only open to schools that belonged to the Pac-12 Conference; however, for the 2018-19 season, the league expanded to include other schools from outside that conference. These schools included Boise State, Eastern Washington, San Diego State, San Jose State, and Western Washington. Because the conference spans the entire west coast, a north and south division format was adopted.

Regular season format
According to the PAC-8 charter, each season starts on October 1st of each year.

Along with the required conference schedule, teams schedule non-conference games against ACHA opponents for regional and national ranking consideration.

For the 2018-19 season, each team must play twelve conference games. At the end of the season the top four teams from the north and south divisions qualify for the playoffs.

In game play, the ACHA follows the NCAA Rulebook for ice hockey. For interconference games, the PAC-8 mostly follows the same rules for game times and structure. A notable difference is in cases of a tie game after regulation and a 5-minute sudden-death overtime period. If a winner is not determined in overtime, then a 5 man shoot-out will occur. During the Conference Championship tournament, overtime format is 20 minute sudden-death periods until a winner is determined.

Members
North Division

South Division

Tournament weekend
The PAC-8 Championship Tournament is typically held the weekend before Presidents Day in February. The weekend also consists of the annual league meeting and the end of season awards banquet.

Past champions

Totals

See also
American Collegiate Hockey Association 
List of ice hockey leagues

ACHA Division 2 conferences
Sports in the Western United States
1995 establishments in the United States